The Internationales Schachturnier Wien 1908  was held in honour of the sixtieth anniversary of Franz Joseph I of Austria’s elevation as Emperor of Austria and King of Hungary. Twenty masters played at the Wiener Schach-Club in Vienna, from March 23 to April 17, 1908.

Results and scores

References

Literature
Marco, Georg "Internationales Schachturnier Wien 1908", Verlag der Wiener Schachzeitung, 1908

Chess competitions
Chess in Austria
1908 in chess
1908 in Austrian sport
1900s in Vienna
April 1908 sports events
Sports competitions in Vienna